A Breton plotter, also known as a Portland course plotter or Weems protractor named after later manufacturers producing similar devices, is a navigational instrument used for nautical navigation with charts. It is a ruler with a rotating rose that enables to plot a course on charts, while aligning the North of the ruler with the North of the chart.

Gueret was a commander in merchant vessels, served on small fishing boats, delivered private yachts and taught navigation. He later extended the use of the plotter to air navigation for small aircraft.

References

Further reading
 https://web.archive.org/web/20210712171156/https://www.cruisersforum.com/forums/f121/special-purpose-protractor-162563-2.html

Navigational equipment